Kyebambe III is the name of:

Ugandan rulers 
 Nyamutukura Kyebambe III of Bunyoro (died 1835), ruled Bunyoro (part of modern-day Uganda) from 1786 to 1835
 Rububi Kyebambe III of Toro (fl. 1870s), ruler of Toro Kingdom